Bag Raiders is the self-titled debut studio album by Australian electronic duo Bag Raiders, released on 1 October 2010 by Modular Recordings. The album debuted at number 7 on the Australian ARIA Albums Chart.

At the J Awards of 2010, the album was nominated for Australian Album of the Year.

Track listing

Charts

References

2010 debut albums
Bag Raiders albums
Modular Recordings albums